Zakia Tabassum is a Bangladeshi politician who was elected as Member of 11th Jatiya Sangsad of Reserved Seats for Women. She is a politician of Bangladesh Awami League.

Family 

Advocate Zakia Tabassum also known as her nickname Jui. Advocate Azizur Rahman M.N.A, one of the top organizers of the Great Liberation War in Bangladesh is her father. Poet and cultural figure Mujtaba Ahmed Murshed is her sibling. She is the youngest of four brothers and four sisters.

Others Information 

Advocate Zakia Tabassum Jui  is a literary and cultural figure. She was the founding general secretary of 'Dinajpur Lekhok Parishad' and the present president of the committee.

References

Living people
Awami League politicians
11th Jatiya Sangsad members
Women members of the Jatiya Sangsad
People from Dinajpur District, Bangladesh
Year of birth missing (living people)
21st-century Bangladeshi women politicians